Southern Railway 4501 is a preserved Ms class 2-8-2 "Mikado" type steam locomotive built in October 1911 by the Baldwin Locomotive Works in Philadelphia, Pennsylvania as the first of its wheel arrangement type for the Southern Railway (SOU). In 1948, the locomotive was retired from the SOU in favor of dieselization and was sold to the shortline Kentucky and Tennessee Railway (K&T) in Stearns, Kentucky to haul coal trains.

When the K&T was dieselized in 1964, No. 4501 was purchased by a railfan named Paul H. Merriman with $5,000 of his own money and brought to Chattanooga, Tennessee. Shortly thereafter it was returned to steam for main line excursion service on the Southern's steam program started by the railroad's president, W. Graham Claytor Jr. in 1966 through Merriman's 4501 Corporation.

Repainted in Southern's passenger Virginian green and gold paint scheme, No. 4501 operated as the main line steam excursion star of Southern's steam program until being replaced by larger steam locomotives in 1985. The locomotive ran again from 1990 until 1994, when Southern's successor Norfolk Southern discontinued the steam program due to rising insurance cost and decreasing rail network availability.

No. 4501 continued operated for the Tennessee Valley Railroad Museum (TVRM) in Chattanooga, Tennessee. Merriman was a founding member of TVRM alongside Robert "Bob" Soule, and eventually handed 4501 over from his personal property to museum property. Repainted into its original freight black livery in 1996, the locomotive was retired when its boiler ticket certificate expired in 1998. 

With the upcoming of Norfolk Southern's 21st Century Steam Program and the success of TVRM's Southern Railway 630, the restoration on No. 4501 began in 2012 and completed in 2014, with period upgrades such as a feedwater heater and mechanical stoker added in which most of 4501's classmates received in the 1940s, but the locomotive itself never received. No. 4501 currently operates in tourist excursion service at TVRM, traditionally on the longer trips to Summerville, Georgia throughout the year and TVRM's Missionary Ridge Local as needed during the weekends.

History

Design
182 2-8-2 "Mikado" type MS class steam locomotives were built by the Baldwin Locomotive Works, the American Locomotive Company, and the Lima Locomotive Works between 1911 and 1917 to haul freight trains for the Southern Railway (SOU) and were numbered in the 4501-4635, 6250-6284, and 6600-6611 series. Some of these locomotives were equipped with Walschaerts (Nos. 4501-4603, 4624-4635) and Southern valve gears (Nos. 4604-4623). In the 1940s, some of the locomotives were eventually re-equipped with Worthington feedwater heaters, mechanical stokers, bigger sand domes, larger tenders, and multiple-bearing crossheads to improve their performances.

Revenue service on the SOU and K&T
No. 4501 was built by Baldwin in October 1911 at a cost of $23,182 as the first of its wheel arrangement type for the Southern Railway. It was assigned to operate on many different divisions of the Southern Railway system from Tennessee, to Virginia, to Kentucky, and  Indiana, hauling freight trains. In the mid-late 1940s, the No. 4501 locomotive was retired from revenue service and was sent to the SOU's Princeton Shops to be stored at a locomotive boneyard in Princeton, Indiana. On October 7, 1948, the Kentucky and Tennessee Railway (K&T), headquartered in Stearns, Kentucky, purchased No. 4501 for $8,225 and renumbered it as their No. 12 locomotive. No. 12 worked on the K&T hauling coal trains until 1964, when the K&T purchased three ALCO S-2s diesel locomotives from the Denver and Rio Grande Western. Consequently, No. 12, along with the K&T's other steam locomotives, were retired from revenue service.

First restoration and excursion service
Railfan Paul H. Merriman purchased No. 12 for the 4501 Corporation with $5,000 of his own money and renumbered it back to 4501. On June 6, 1964, after No. 4501 moved under its own power to Chattanooga from the K&T, an initial restoration was underwent by the Tennessee Valley Railroad Museum (TVRM) volunteers at the facilities of the Lucey Boiler Company in Chattanooga near the TVRM's storage facilities, which were at the time located on former Western Union Company tracks.

No. 4501 was stripped down for an extensive overhaul with the thin cab floor, the rotted ash pan, and the rusty smokebox front replaced. The dented cab roof was straightened and a radio antenna was installed. The cylinder cocks were reworked and the throttle was lapped with a new airline run to the repacked reversing gear. With the homage of the SOU executives, the No. 4501 was repainted in the Southern passenger Virginian green and gold paint scheme inspired by the Ps-4 locomotives being painted in that livery as opposed to No. 4501's original freight black livery. After the restoration was completed in August 1966, the No. 4501 locomotive pulled its inaugural excursion train between Chattanooga and Richmond, Virginia, officially kicking off the SOU's new steam excursion program. 

In 1969, No. 4501 was upgraded with a larger tender that was originally used behind a Central of Georgia 2-10-2, before being used for a maintenance of way wreck train in Georgia. At the same time in November, during the 75th anniversary of the Southern Railway, an event called the "Steam-O-Rama" took place in Anniston, Alabama, along the Birmingham to Atlanta main line. It featured No. 4501, Savannah and Atlanta (S&A) No. 750, which was restored by the Atlanta Chapter NRHS, and London and North Eastern Railway (LNER) A3 No. 4472 Flying Scotsman, which was in the course of its USA tour at the time.

Throughout the summer of 1973, with the request of Trains Magazine editor, David P. Morgan, No. 4501 operated outside of Southern Railway property to pull a series of excursion trips in the Midwestern United States on the Illinois Central (IC), the Chicago and North Western (C&NW), the Milwaukee Road (MILW), the Rock Island (RI), and the Norfolk and Western (N&W). During that time, the locomotive was selected to pull that year's Schlitz Circus World Museum (CWM) train, on the CN&W mainline between Baraboo and Madison, Wisconsin and the MILW’s mainline to Milwaukee. This was the final time a steam locomotive pulled the CWM's train before the annual Circus event was halted for a twelve-year hiatus. Between July 4 and 9 of that year, the locomotive pulled a long-distance excursion, entitled "The Independence Limited", between Chicago, Illinois and Washington, D.C., and during the journey, No. 4501 travelled on the Western Maryland (WM).

On March 28, 1979, No. 4501 became listed on the National Register of Historic Places. On April 11, 1981, the locomotive suffered a cracked front flue sheet at Dalton, Georgia while pulling an excursion trip from Atlanta, Georgia to Chattanooga. A diesel locomotive pulled the remainder of the trip while No. 4501 was towed back to the Irondale Workshop in Birmingham, Alabama for a long-term rebuild until November 1984. The tender's old Andrews pilot trucks were replaced with modern roller bearing trucks.

At the end of the 1985 operating season, the locomotive was retired from main line excursion service and moved back to the TVRM due to the steam program being expanded by the Southern's successor, Norfolk Southern (NS) with larger N&W steam locomotives, 4-8-4 J class No. 611 and 2-6-6-4 A class No. 1218 to haul the longer and heavier excursion trains. Five years later, No. 4501 returned to main line excursion service to negotiate with lines that were off limits with the two N&W locomotives. 

On November 3, 1991, during the 25th anniversary of the Southern steam program, No. 4501 triple headed with N&W 611 and 1218 to pull an excursion train of 28 passenger cars from Chattanooga to Atlanta. At Ooltewah, Tennessee, No. 4501 took some passenger cars for a complete round trip, turning around at Cleveland, Tennessee. Afterwards, the 611 and 1218 completed the rest of the trip to Atlanta.

In 1994, the NS executives announced that they would discontinue their steam program due to serious safety concerns, rising insurance costs, the expense of maintaining steam locomotives, and decreasing rail network availability due to a surge in freight traffic. No. 4501 made its last public NS main line excursion trip from Birmingham to Columbus, Georgia on April 30, but was taken off at Alexander City, Alabama due to overheated bearings, and the Norfolk Southern GP59 diesel locomotive No. 4610 finished the rest of the trip. Afterwards, the No. 4501 returned to TVRM on May 25.

After Norfolk Southern ended their steam program in late 1994, No. 4501 remained at TVRM operating their excursion runs through North Georgia on the Chattooga and Chickamauga Railway shortline. In October 1996, the locomotive was repainted back to its original freight black livery for TVRM's 35th anniversary. It continued to operate, until it was retired due to the expiration of its boiler ticket on September 20, 1998.

Second restoration and excursion service
In June 2010, Norfolk Southern announced that they would run excursions with No. 4501 and 2-8-0 "Consolidation" No. 630 with their new 21st Century Steam program. In March 2011, No. 630 returned to service pulling tourist trains for the TVRM and some of the first main line excursion trips for the 21st Century Steam program. With No. 630 in operating condition, the restoration of No. 4501 began in 2012.

During the restoration of No. 4501 around 2013, the locomotive received upgrades to its trailing wheels that included the addition of roller bearings to help guide the locomotive through track curves. A replica of a Worthington SA type feedwater heater from a 2-10-2 China Railways QJ Class was used to improve the locomotive's performance. Its tender was given a mechanical stoker from Canadian National Railway No. 5288, a 4-6-2 steam locomotive that was also on display at TVRM. The Armstrong lubricators that spring-loaded the driving wheels were replenished by an automatic lubricator from the North Yorkshire Moors Railway in North Yorkshire, England.

On September 6, 2014, No. 4501 was steamed up for the first time in 18 years, and it made its debut at TVRM's 2014 Railfest. The locomotive made a test run from Chattanooga to LaFayette, Georgia on the Chattooga and Chickamauga Railway line on September 25, 2014 to be prepared for TVRM's upcoming annual Summerville Steam Special on October 4 that year.

On May 1, 2015, No. 4501 returned to the Norfolk Southern main line for the first time in 21 years and successfully completed a test run from TVRM to Cleveland, Tennessee and return. On June 26, 2015, No. 4501 began to participate in the 21st Century Steam program, running the Radford Rambler excursion from Bristol to Radford, Virginia. On June 27, the locomotive pulled the Lonesome Pine Special excursion from Bristol to Bulls Gap, Tennessee, and ran the Radford Rambler again on June 28.

On September 12 and 13, 2015, No. 4501 ran a round trip excursion from Chattanooga to Cleveland, during TVRM's 2015 Railfest, but on Sunday, the locomotive was taken off the excursion due to some poor coal damaging its firebox grates. Two weeks later, the locomotive pulled the Nancy Hanks Special excursion from Macon to Tennille, Georgia.

No. 4501's main line excursion career for the 21st Century Steam program was very short-lived however. It was planned to run the Piedmont Limited round trip excursion from Atlanta to Toccoa, Georgia on October 3 and 4, 2015, but it was cancelled on October 1 due to Hurricane Joaquin. As a result, Norfolk Southern officially concluded their 21st Century Steam program, while No. 4501 remained at TVRM to continue excursion operations and became the main motive power for its annual Summerville Steam Special excursion from Chattanooga to Summerville, Georgia. In September 2019, No. 4501 temporarily masqueraded as Louisville and Nashville J-3 Mikado No. 1593 for the Louisville & Nashville Railroad Historical Society annual convention.

Appearances in media
No. 4501 made its first feature film appearance in the 1971 movie Fools' Parade in which it was repainted to look resemble a Baltimore & Ohio steam locomotive.
No. 4501 is shown while under steam in the 1974 movie Ridin' the Rails: The Great American Train Story. A clip of this movie, with Johnny Cash at the throttle of the locomotive, was used in the music video for Hurt, which was covered by Cash.
No. 4501 starred in the 1976 television movie Eleanor and Franklin.
No. 4501 appears several times in the 1978 movie Summer of My German Soldier, set in Georgia during World War II.
No. 4501 was used in the 1999 movie October Sky where it was dressed up to look like an N&W locomotive.
No. 4501 was the subject of the 2016 feature-length documentary And Then There Was One, which chronicles the history of the locomotive's career to that point.

Gallery

See also
Baltimore and Ohio 4500
Canadian National 3254
Grand Canyon Railway 4960
Grand Trunk Western 4070
Nickel Plate Road 587
Soo Line 1003

Notes

References

Bibliography

Further reading

External links

And Then There Was One documentary on YouTube
Southern Railway 4501
Tennessee Valley Railroad Museum official website
 

2-8-2 locomotives
Baldwin locomotives
Freight locomotives
Individual locomotives of the United States
National Register of Historic Places in Hamilton County, Tennessee
Rail transportation on the National Register of Historic Places in Tennessee
Railway locomotives introduced in 1911
Railway locomotives on the National Register of Historic Places
Standard gauge locomotives of the United States
Steam locomotives of Southern Railway (U.S.)
Preserved steam locomotives of Tennessee